|}

The Dorans Pride Novice Hurdle is a Grade 2 National Hunt novice hurdle in Ireland which is open to horses aged four years or older. 

It is run at Limerick over a distance of 3 miles (4,828 metres) and during its running there are 14 flights of hurdles to be jumped. It is scheduled to take place each year in late December.

The race was first run in 2003 and is named as a tribute to Dorans Pride a top class staying hurdler and chaser trained by Michael Hourigan. It was upgraded from Grade 3 to Grade 2 in 2015 having been won by Faugheen and Martello Tower in the previous two renewals. The 2016 and 2017 runnings were sponsored by Guinness and run as the Guinness Novice Hurdle. In 2018 it was sponsored by Sky Sports and since 2019 the sponsor has been Lyons of Limerick.

Records
Leading jockey (2 wins):
 Emmet Mullins - Enterprise Park (2009), Faugheen (2013) 
 Niall Madden – 	Knockfierna (2010), Our Vinnie (2012) 
 Danny Mullins -  Martello Tower (2014), Fabulous Saga (2017) 

Leading trainer  (6 wins):
 Willie Mullins – Our Ben (2004), Enterprise Park (2009), Faugheen (2013), Up For Review (2015), Penhill (2016), Fabulous Saga (2017)

Winners

See also
 Horse racing in Ireland
 List of Irish National Hunt races

References

Racing Post:

National Hunt races in Ireland
National Hunt hurdle races
Limerick Racecourse
Recurring sporting events established in 2003
2003 establishments in Ireland